Didriksen is a Norwegian surname. Notable people with the surname include:

Aagot Didriksen (1874–1968), Norwegian actress
Babe Didrikson Zaharias, (1911-1956), Norwegian-American athlete
Jan Didriksen (1917–1996), Norwegian jurist and businessman
Jørn Didriksen (born 1953), Norwegian speed skater

Norwegian-language surnames